Schnackenberg is a surname of German origin, being a variant of the surname Schnackenburg. Notable people with the surname include:

Annie Schnackenberg (1835-1905), New Zealand missionary, temperance and welfare worker, and suffragist
Elmer Jacob Schnackenberg (1889-1968), American judge
Gjertrud Schnackenberg (born 1953), American poet
Tom Schnackenberg (born 1945), New Zealand sailor and yacht designer
Walter Schnackenberg (1880-1961), German painter and illustrator

See also
Schnackenburg, a town in Lower Saxony, Germany
Schnackenburg (surname)